Age Of Denial is the third full-length album released by Sennen on April 5, 2010, under the label, Hungry Audio.

Track listing 

 "Age of Denial" – 4:42
 "With You" – 5:01
 "A Little High" – 6:02
 "Falling Down" – 5:52
 "S.O.S." – 4:08
 "Innocence" – 3:38
 "Red Horizon" – 3:29
 "Can't See The Light" – 6:23
 "Sleep Heavy Tonight" – 5:27
 "Sennen's Day Out" – 1:26
 "Broken Promise" – 6:15
 "Out of Our Depth" – 1:54

References 

2010 albums